Live Is Life is a 2021 adventure film directed by  and written by Albert Espinosa which stars Adrián Baena, Juan del Pozo, Raúl del Pozo, David Rodríguez, and Javier Casellas.

Synopsis 
It is set in 1985. Five friends plan to escape on midsummer's night to look for a flower that, according to legend, has magical powers.

Cast

Production 
The film is an Atresmedia Cine, 4 Cats Pictures and Life is life AIE production. Shooting locations included the south of the province of Lugo (Pantón, Sober, Quiroga, O’Saviñao, Monforte de Lemos) and the province of Ourense (Esgos).

Release 
It had its official premiere at the 24th Málaga Film Festival on 6 June 2021. Although the national theatrical release in Spain was on August 13, it was later delayed to November 5 due to the complications of the theatrical releases by the COVID-19 pandemic. Finally, it had to be postponed again to 3 June 2022. It was distributed by Warner Bros. Pictures Spain. It was later released in some territories on Netflix in July 2022.

Reception
In the United States' review aggregator, the Rotten Tomatoes, in the score where the site staff categorizes the opinions of independent media and mainstream media only positive or negative, the film has an approval rating of 80% calculated based on 5 critics reviews. By comparison, with the same opinions being calculated using a weighted arithmetic mean, the score achieved is 6.30/10.

In the newspaper El Mundo, Javier Estrada said it is "an adventure film that can almost be interpreted as Goonies in Spain". In Movie Nation , Roger Moore rated it 2/4 stars saying that it's "original only in the number of movies it cribs from. But it isn’t Stand By Me, it’s not really Five Teens and a Baby, and it sure as shooting isn’t Goonies.

In his review in Escribiendo Cine, Juan Pablo Russo gave it a 6/10 rating saying that "De la Torre, a filmmaker accustomed to action and thrillers, steps out of his comfort zone and imbues his film with a bittersweet adventurous tone creating an effective melodrama" In the newspaper A Gazeta (Brazil), Rafael Braz said that "it is interesting how Live is Life uses clichés in an intelligent way to create good dramas".

In Common Sense Media, Brian Costello said that "this is an engaging coming-of-age dramedy with enough story and acting talent to overcome the familiar aspects to this 'hero's journey'."

See also 
 List of films impacted by the COVID-19 pandemic
 List of Spanish films of 2022
 List of Netflix exclusive international distribution films
 List of coming-of-age stories

References

External links 
 

2021 comedy-drama films
Spanish comedy-drama films
Spanish adventure films
Films about summer camps
2020s teen comedy-drama films
Spanish coming-of-age films
2020s coming-of-age comedy-drama films
Films about cancer
Warner Bros. films
Films postponed due to the COVID-19 pandemic
Films set in 1985
Atresmedia Cine films
Films shot in Galicia (Spain)
2020s Spanish films
2020s Spanish-language films